The XXV Army Corps was an army corps of Germany's Wehrmacht during World War II.

History

Formation 
The XXV Army Corps was established as a reserve command staff in the Upper Rhine border region in 1938. This staff was mobilized as Generalkommando Oberrhein on 26 August 1939 and renamed XXV Army Corps on 17 September 1939. It was initially part of the 7th Army (Dollmann) under Army Group C (von Leeb), tasked with guarding the Franco-German border. The division remained in the Upper Rhine area until the Battle of France in June 1940.

Occupation duty in France, 1940 – 1944 

After the Battle of France, the XXV Army Corps became part of the German occupation force in France. It served briefly under the 12th Army (Wilhelm List) between May and June 1940. Subsequently, the XXV Army Corps served a three-month tenure under the guidance of the 1st Army between September and November 1940. Under both the 12th and 1st Armies, the XXV Army Corps was on occupation duty in Eastern France. On the rearend of that service, the corps switched from Army Group C to Army Group D (Erwin von Witzleben, the OB West). Under Army Group D, the XXV Army Corps was reassigned to the 6th Army (von Reichenau), where it remained between December 1940 and April 1941. Under the 6th Army, the XXV Army Corps was redeployed from eastern France to the country's northwest.

In May 1941, the XXV Army Corps returned to the control of its initial superior formation, the 7th Army (Dollmann). It would remain under the 7th Army until July 1944. The corps was moved to the Brittany region. The corps headquarters were at Pontivy.

On 24 April 1943, divisions under its command included the 94th Infantry Division at Quimperlé and the 76th Infantry Division at Redon.

On 30 October 1943, Wilhelm Fahrmbacher received the German Cross in Silver for his service as the commander of XXV Army Corps.

On 3 June 1944, just before the Allied invasion, the corps, still at Pontivy, oversaw the 275th Infantry Division at Redon, the 265th Infantry Division at Quimperlé, the 2nd Parachute Division at Quintin and the 343rd Infantry Division at Landerneau. On the northern cost of Brittany, the LXXIV Army Corps at Guingamp secured the XXV Army Corps' right.

Western Front, 1944 – 1945 
The Allied Normandy landings on 6 June 1944 re-opened the Western Front. The Allied attacks at the beaches Gold, Sword, Omaha, Utah and Juno in Normandy (Operation Neptune) attacked the positions of LXXXIV Army Corps, which stood to the right of LXXIV Army Corps, which was in turn the right neighbor of XXV Army Corps.
The units of the XXV Army Corps were pushed into the Atlantic pockets at Brest, Lorient and Saint-Nazaire in August 1944 as a result of the Allied breakthrough from southwestern Normandy into Brittany (Operation Cobra). Beginning on 1 August 1944, the newly formed Twelfth U.S. Army Group pushed from Pontaubault into Brittany. In total, the American force that pushed through the far end of the Allied right flank included four armored and eight infantry divisions. The Allied forces reached Rennes at 1 August, Saint-Malo on 5 August and Brest on 6 August. Furthermore, a southward push by the 4th U.S. Armored Division from Rennes towards Saint-Nazaire and Nantes began on 3 August with the goal of cutting Brittany off any Axis reinforcements. The CCA of 4th Armored Division would take Nantes on 12 August. The XXV Army Corps had quickly retreated its forces into an area around Lorient, starting south of Pont-Scorff and reaching southeast all the wait to Quiberon Bay, including the Quiberon peninsula. Here, the CCB of 4th Armored Division makes first contact with the defenses of the XXV Army Corps on 7 August 1945 at 09:00. Subsequently, the American siege units were content with allowing most of the German garrisons to remain in their pockets; only Brest and Saint-Malo fell under heavy immediate attack. US Army units completed the liberation of Saint-Malo on 18 August 1944.

The forces of the 2nd Parachute Division, 266th Infantry Division and 343rd Infantry Division, constituting most of the remains of the XXV Army Corps, were trapped in Brest, where they were defeated until 19 September 1944 in the Battle for Brest.The Lorient fortress held out against the Allied siege until after the German surrender on 8 May 1945. The commander of XXV Army Corps Wilhelm Fahrmbacher surrendered the fortress on 10 May 1945.

Commanders 

 Alfred Wäger, corps commander from August 1939 to November 1939.
 Karl Ritter von Prager, corps commander from November 1939 to May 1942.
 Wilhelm Fahrmbacher, corps commander from May 1942 to June 1944 and again from June 1944 until surrender.
 Dietrich von Choltitz, corps commander in June 1944. Later instrumental in the Liberation of Paris.

Organizational chart

References 

Corps of Germany in World War II
Military units and formations established in 1938
Military units and formations disestablished in 1945